The Slugger's Wife is a 1985 romantic comedy film about a baseball star who falls for a singer. Written by Neil Simon, directed by Hal Ashby and produced by Ray Stark, the film stars Michael O'Keefe, Rebecca De Mornay, and Randy Quaid. It was distributed by Columbia Pictures and released on March 29, 1985.

Plot summary
Darryl Palmer is a baseball player for the Atlanta Braves. He enjoys the fame and fringe benefits of bachelor life until he meets rock singer Debby Huston, falls in love, and decides to settle down.

Debby is not ready to put her professional hopes on hold, but from the moment Darryl meets her, his own career takes off. He seeks to break professional baseball's single-season home run record and considers Debby a good-luck charm, wanting her to be there at his games.

Manager Burly DeVito appreciates that Darryl has found a settling influence in his life, but teammates Moose Granger and Manny Alvarado become increasingly aware of how obsessed Darryl is with Debby and how unhappy she has become. She feels smothered by her husband, who interferes with her career ambitions and goes into a jealous funk whenever she goes on the road.

The couple breaks up, to the detriment of Darryl's game and his pursuit of one of baseball's greatest feats. He begins to fail on a regular basis and the team's playoff chances could be in jeopardy. Burly and his players concoct a plan to have another woman, hidden by shadows, pretend to be Darryl's wife, telling him everything he wants to hear. It works temporarily, then backfires.

Debby comes back to try to work things out. Darryl does indeed hit his record-breaking home run, but whether the couple's relationship can ever be what it once was remains uncertain.

Cast

 Michael O'Keefe as Darryl Palmer
 Rebecca De Mornay as Debby Huston
 Randy Quaid as Moose Granger
 Cleavant Derricks as Manny Alvarado
 Martin Ritt as Burly DeVito
 Lisa Langlois as Aline Cooper
 Loudon Wainwright III as Gary
 Georgann Johnson as Marie DeVito
 Danny Tucker as Coach O'Brien
 Lynn Whitfield as Tina Alvarado

Reception
The Slugger's Wife was a total critical and commercial failure. The film has a 0% favorable rating on the Rotten Tomatoes web site based on ten reviews.

A review in The New York Times by Janet Maslin began: "It's a shock to find Neil Simon's name attached to something as resoundingly unfunny as this." Roger Ebert gave the film two stars out of four and wrote that it "has a story that demands to be taken as lighthearted nonsense, and since the screenplay is by Neil Simon, we go in expecting to have a good time. But, no, Simon's not in a lighthearted mood, and so the silliness of the story gets bogged down in all sorts of gloomy neuroses, angry denunciations, and painful self-analysis." Gene Siskel of the Chicago Tribune also awarded two stars out of four and wrote that "we can't help but laugh at the miscasting. Simon's writing should be spoken by adults, not kids. 'The Slugger's Wife' might have worked if the ballplayer were, say, Pete Rose's age, and his wife was Tina Turner's age, but with 20-year-old-looking stars on the screen, we have to shake our heads when listening to them discussing major lifestyle decisions." Variety described the film as "about as affecting as a rock video. Despite some decent tunes and interesting performances, elements never jell." Michael Wilmington of the Los Angeles Times wrote, "A movie directed by Hal Ashby shouldn't seem so frequently tame and predictable; a movie written by Neil Simon shouldn't have such sometimes sparkless dialogue." Paul Attanasio of The Washington Post wrote, "After 'This Is Spinal Tap' and the book 'Ball Four,' you'd hardly think you could make a dull movie about baseball, rock 'n' roll or the two together. But here is a Neil Simon movie with all of his banality, but none of his humor—a sort of 'The Nod Couple.'" David Ansen of Newsweek declared, "We might care if we believed in the fateful love of these two people, but this baseball player has the sensitivity of a catcher's mitt, and we only put up with him because O'Keefe is a cute kid. De Mornay is an even cuter kid, but between the two of them there's maybe 40 watts of electricity."

The film was nominated for a Golden Raspberry Award for Worst Original Song for the song "Oh, Jimmy!"

According to the web site AllMovie.com, the film earned $1,300,000 in box-office receipts.

References

External links
 
 
 

1985 films
1985 romantic comedy films
1980s sports comedy films
American baseball films
Columbia Pictures films
Films scored by Patrick Williams
Films directed by Hal Ashby
Atlanta Braves
Films with screenplays by Neil Simon
Films set in Atlanta
1980s English-language films
1980s American films
Films about Major League Baseball